The 1951 All-Ireland Senior Football Championship was the 65th staging of Ireland's premier Gaelic football knock-out competition.

Mayo won their second All-Ireland in a row.

The Curse of '51

Mayo have not won an All-Ireland football final since 1951. Legend has it that a priest became furious when the Mayo team bus returning home from the 1951 final passed by a funeral without showing respect as they celebrated their All-Ireland win. The priest supposedly put a curse on Mayo, that they would not win another title until all of the team had died. Since the deaths of Pádraig Carney in 2019 and Paddy Prendergast in 2021, only one member of the 1951 team remain living – Mick Loftus, though he was a sub and did not play on the day. Prendergast, who was the final surviving member of the team and played at full-back, died at the age of 95 on 26 September 2021.

The curse is one that was disproven, for records show there was no funeral in Foxford on that day.

Results

Connacht Senior Football Championship

Leinster Senior Football Championship

Munster Senior Football Championship

Ulster Senior Football Championship

All-Ireland Senior Football Championship

Championship statistics

Miscellaneous

 In fact the Leinster football championship saw a triple of draws and replays they were in the following games as we know,
- Preliminary Round, Longford vs Carlow.
- Quarter-Final, Wexford vs Westmeath.
- Semi-Final, Meath vs Louth.
 The All Ireland semi-final between Meath and Antrim was their first championship meeting.
 Mayo are All Ireland Champions for 2 in a row and Connacht Champions for 4 in a row.

References